Looks Like a Job For... is the fifth album by emcee Big Daddy Kane, released in 1993 on Cold Chillin' Records.

After the commercial failure of his 1991 album Prince of Darkness, Kane was able to reclaim his past status, with an album considered a return to his prior greatness. Unlike previous albums, Kane involved a large number of outside producers for the project including future production stars the Trackmasters, Easy Mo Bee, and Large Professor.

Looks Like a Job For... featured Kane's first Top 40 Billboard Hot 100 hit, "Very Special," as well as the underground hip-hop hit "How U Get a Record Deal?" and a remix of the track "’Nuff Respect," which was originally from the soundtrack of the film Juice.

Album guests include Kane's brother Little Daddy Shane, Kane's backup dancers Scoob & Scrap Lover, and Spinderella of Salt-N-Pepa.

Track listing

Album singles

Charts

Weekly charts

Year-end charts

Singles

References

Big Daddy Kane albums
1993 albums
Cold Chillin' Records albums
Albums produced by Easy Mo Bee
Albums produced by Big Daddy Kane
Albums produced by Large Professor
Albums produced by Trackmasters